Virginia Beach City Football Club is an American professional soccer club based in Norfolk, Virginia playing in the National Premier Soccer League (NPSL) in the Mid-Atlantic Conference of the Northeast Region.  The club was founded in 2013 and held its inaugural season in 2014 with their first regular season match on May 17.

Since their formation, they have finished in the top three in the Mid-Atlantic Conference every season. They won the title as the 2017 NPSL Mid-Atlantic Regular Season Champions with an undefeated season, as well as qualifying for two playoff seeds in 2015 and 2017. The club also partakes in the U.S. Open Cup competition via qualification, and did so in 2015.

Virginia Beach City FC announced November 26, 2018 it will upgrade its current semi-professional men's soccer team to field a professional men's soccer team in the National Premier Soccer League (NPSL) in 2019 joining the Richmond Kickers and Loudoun United as the only other professional soccer teams based in Virginia competing on a national stage. Virginia Beach City FC is the first soccer club in Hampton Roads to provide the full player development pyramid from youth and amateur to professional on a year-round basis. Virginia Beach City FC has a developmental affiliation with Major League Soccer's D.C. United.

History

Branding

Crest 
The centerpiece of the crest is Neptune's trident, inspired by the 34-foot cast bronze Neptune statue on the Virginia Beach boardwalk. The navy blue and gold are a nod to the city that is home to one of the United States' biggest naval bases. The insignia that recognizes Navy SEALs is a gold trident.

The crest was made by graphic designer Matthew Wolff, who has since designed the current crests for Los Angeles FC, New York City FC, Charleston Battery, Union Omaha, FC Tulsa, and Oakland Roots.

Jersey Sponsors 

On February 21, 2018, Virginia Beach City FC and Adidas announced an extension to their long-term partnership through 2021 making Adidas the official supplier for the club.

Stadium
The team plays at the Powhatan Field which is a stadium built in 2005 and seats 2,800; located in Norfolk, Virginia.
VB City FC moved to Powhatan Field on March 1, 2019; leaving its former home in Virginia Beach Sportsplex which had been home to the club since its inception. VB City cited the move was due to both aiming to become a more centralized club to the Hampton Roads area and the safety that the new turf at Powhatan Field provided to the players.

Club culture

Supporters
Neptune's Armada are the local supporters for the club and can be seen attending matches and chanting songs for the whole ninety-minute duration of the match. The Armada has an affiliation with Virginia Beach's chapter of The American Outlaws. The group is led by long time City supporter Andrew Cowan.

Rivals
Playing in the Mid-Atlantic Conference, Virginia Beach City FC plays Charlottesville Alliance FC, FC Baltimore Christos, FC Frederick, First State FC, Maryland Bobcats FC, and Northern Virginia United FC year in and year out. Match ups with Northern Virginia United have been chippy between the two in recent years while FC Baltimore has been VB's toughest competition in the group. VB City FC also annually plays D.C. United U-23 as part of their affiliation with the Major League club.

Youth development
The Virginia Beach City FC U23/Reserves is the development team for the club. It is designed to develop players for the First Team squad, and with the objective of placing them in top collegiate programs. VB City FC established their boy's and girl's academy teams in the Fall 2016. The academies have quickly grown and have seen former academy players Julian Barrios depart for D.C. United's academy; eventually to Houston Dynamo's academy and Samuel Jones depart for Philadelphia Union's Academy and the United States U17 National Team.

Ownership
NPSL Virginia Beach is led by owner Steven Wagoner. Wagoner is the founder and partner of Nexus Street, LLC, which is a privately held consulting and investment development company headquartered in Fairfax, Virginia. Wagoner founded Virginia Beach City FC. He previously owned and operated D.C. United's affiliate semi professional team, D.C. United U-23; in 2013 and 2014. Under his tenure, the team earned a Lamar Hunt US Open Cup Berth, NPSL Playoff Berth, and NPSL Mid Atlantic Conference Regular Season Championship Title. During the inaugural season, the team was coached by D.C. United legend, Jaime Moreno.

Wagoner serves on the Advisory Board for George Mason University’s Center for Sport Management; his alma mater where he received a B.S. Degree with concentrations in Sport Management and Business Administration. He was a member of the GMU NCAA Men’s Soccer Team - CAA Champion and NCAA Tournament berth which earned Top 20 National Rankings. Lastly, Steven Wagoner has served on the Board of Directors for the National Premier Soccer League since 2013.

Broadcasting
The club first broadcast their matches to an online audience during the 2018 NPSL season. The last few home matches were streamed on the team's YouTube channel. In the spring of 2019, the league announced a deal with online soccer streaming platform, MyCujoo. Virginia Beach City FC has been streaming their matches on the website ever since.

Current roster 

Source: Virginia Beach City FC Roster

Team management

Year by year

Honors
National Premier Soccer League
Mid-Atlantic Conference 
Regular Season Champions: 2017

Records

References

External links
Official team site

Association football clubs established in 2013
National Premier Soccer League teams
Soccer clubs in Virginia
Soccer clubs in Hampton Roads
2013 establishments in Virginia